The 2015 Silverstone GP3 Series round was a GP3 Series motor race held on July 4 and 5, 2015 at Silverstone Circuit in Silverstone, Britain. It was the third round of the 2015 GP3 Series. The race was used to support the 2015 British Grand Prix.

Classification

Qualifying

Feature Race

Sprint Race

See also 
 2015 British Grand Prix
 2015 Silverstone GP2 Series round

References

External links 
 Official website of GP3 Series

2015 GP3 round reports
GP3
Silverstone
2015 in Formula Three